Rockin' in Rhythm: A Tribute to Duke Ellington is an album by jazz guitarist John Pizzarelli celebrating the music of Duke Ellington.

Track listing
"In a Mellow Tone" (Duke Ellington, Milt Gabler) – 4:10
"East St. Louis Toodle-Oo/Don't Get Around Much Anymore" (Ellington, Bubber Miley, Bob Russell) – 3:39
"Satin Doll" (Ellington, Johnny Mercer, Billy Strayhorn – 3:37
"C Jam Blues" (Ellington) – 7:57
"In My Solitude" (Eddie DeLange, Ellington, Irving Mills) – 3:50
"Just Squeeze Me" (Ellington, Lee Raines) – 3:19
"Perdido" (Ervin Drake, Hans Lengsfelder, Juan Tizol) – 4:09
"All Too Soon" (Ellington, Carl Sigman) – 3:08
"I'm Beginning to See the Light" (Ellington, Don George, Johnny Hodges, Harry James) – 4:05
"Love Scene" (Ellington) – 3:46
"I Got It Bad (and That Ain't Good)" (Ellington, Paul Francis Webster) – 3:45
"Cotton Tail"/"Rockin' in Rhythm" (Harry Carney, Ellington, Mills) – 4:00

Personnel
 John Pizzarelli – guitar, vocals
 Tony Kadlech – trumpet
 John Mosca – trombone, alto horn
 Andy Fusco – alto saxophone, clarinet
 Harry Allen – tenor saxophone
 Kenny Berger – baritone saxophone, bass clarinet
 Larry Fuller – piano
 Bucky Pizzarelli – guitar
 Martin Pizzarelli – double bass
 Tony Tedesco – drums
 Kurt Elling – vocals
 Jessica Molaskey – vocals
 Aaron Weinstein – violin

References

2010 albums
John Pizzarelli albums
Duke Ellington tribute albums
Telarc Records albums